
Lago di Muzzano is a lake in Ticino, Switzerland. It is bordered by the municipalities of Sorengo, Muzzano and Collina d'Oro. It drains into Lake Lugano.

External links

Lakes of Ticino
Lakes of the Swiss Alps